Punta is a form of Garinagu music.

Punta may also refer to:

 Punta, Spanish for "point" or promontory, is a part of many Spanish toponyms
 Punta (butterfly), a genus of grass skipper butterfly
 Punta rock, a rock version of Ppunta music
 Punta, Calamba, a barangay in Calamba, Philippines
 The modern name of Actium, an ancient town in western Greece
 Punta, a town in the municipality Umag in Croatia

See also
 La Punta (disambiguation)
 Ponta (disambiguation)
  - includes many geographical locations
 Punt (disambiguation)